WFD is a three letter acronym that can stand for:

Water Framework Directive, piece of European Union legislation
Westminster Foundation for Democracy
Wi-Fi Display, the technical name for the Miracast standard
World's Fastest Drummer
World Federation of the Deaf
World Food Day
Word-finding difficulties - in medical setting, terminology used in the assessment of cognitive ability